This is a list of actors appearing on the 1978–1991 US television series Dallas. During its 14 seasons on air, the show featured 21 regular cast members. Further more, 32 actors were billed as "also starring" during the first scene of the episodes, and 24 were billed as "special guest star" in the closing credits. Additionally, hundreds more were billed as either guest stars or co-stars. This list includes those with at least eight appearances.

Starring

Notes

Also starring

Special guest stars

Guest stars

Co-stars

References

 
 

Dallas
Cast